Superbe was a  74-gun ship of the line of the French Navy. Her hull was copper sheathed.

Career 
In 1787, Superbe was the flagship of the Escadre d'évolution under Nieuil. She departed Brest in June for the training cruise and reached Lisbon before returning in August. 

She took part in the Croisière du Grand Hiver, where she sank due to a leak. Her crew were rescued by Pierre Maurice Julien de Quérangal.

Sources and references 
 Notes

Citations

References
 
 

External links
 Ships of the line

Ships of the line of the French Navy
Téméraire-class ships of the line
Shipwrecks in the Bay of Biscay
1784 ships
Maritime incidents in 1795
Ships built in France